Trung Luu is an Australian politician. He is a member of the Victorian Liberal Party and is a member of the Victorian Legislative Council, representing the Western Metropolitan Region since November 2022. He was previously a councillor for the Brimbank City Council.

He is the first Vietnamese State Member of Parliament to represent the Liberal Party in the Legislative Council.

Early life 
Trung arrived in Australia as a refugee in the late 1970s from Vietnam after the fall of Saigon and is married with five young children.

Before Parliament 
He served for 28 years with Victoria Police and championed bridging the gap between the Vietnamese Community and Victoria Police where he presented the Victoria Police Multicultural Media award in 2010.  Trung has also completed a Graduate Diploma in Public Safety and Forensic Investigation.

Trung also served for 19 years with the Australian Army Reserve.  In 2016 he presented with the Junior Non-Commissioner Reserve TASMAN Scheme award for leadership, dedication, and commitment, and the honour of representing ADF in a bilateral exchange program with NZDF. 

In 2019 Bushfire Assists Trung led a team of mobile units in the Alpine area, northwest of Victoria, assisting local authorities and evacuating residents from the fire fronts.

Political Life

2018 State Election 
Trung contested the seat of St Albans in the 2018 State election where he was unsuccessful.

2020 Council Election 
Trung contested the Brimbank Council election and was elected as a councillor.

2022 State Election 
Trung was preselected by the Liberal Party for the Western Metropolitan Region for the second spot on their electoral ticket. He was successfully elected to Parliament at the 2022 Victorian state election.

Trung was elevated to shadow Parliamentary secretary for Multicultural Affairs in John Pesutto's shadow cabinet in December.

References 

Australian people of Vietnamese descent
Members of the Victorian Legislative Council
Liberal Party of Australia members of the Parliament of Victoria
Victoria Police
Year of birth missing (living people)
Living people